Death of Desire is a metal band formed in Bruchsal, Germany in 2008, featuring Mayhem drummer Hellhammer and vocalist Dawn Desirée. Their debut album ANTIhuman has been recorded in Knut Magne Valle's Mølla Studio and band member Morbid has said that the album will not be released until the  band finds a suitable record company to release it through. Mayhem singer Attila Csihar will be guest vocalist on the track "Inner Sanctum".

Members
Dawn Desirée – vocals
Morbid – guitars
Hellhammer – drums
Pzy Clone – Synthesizers & Orchestras
Attila Csihar – Guest Singer

Discography
ANTIhuman - (N/A-2012)

References

External links

Official Death of Desire page at signmeto.roadrunnerrecords.com

German heavy metal musical groups
Musical groups established in 2008